The Water Act 1973 (1973 c.37) is an Act of the Parliament of the United Kingdom that reorganised the water, sewage and river management industry in England and Wales. Water supply and sewage disposal were removed from local authority control, and ten larger regional water authorities were set up, under state control based on the areas of super-sets of river authorities which were also subsumed into the new authorities. Each regional water authority consisted of members appointed by the Secretary of State for the Environment, and by the various local authorities in its area.

The Act also established a National Water Council. This body consisted of a chairman nominated by the minister, the chairmen of each regional authority and not more than ten additional members nominated by the government. The Council's duties included implementing national water policy, assisting the ten regional authorities in matters of joint concern, and setting and enforcing national regulations and byelaws on water quality and conservation.

Background
The 1973 Act was another step towards an integrated policy of water management, which like much of the previous legislation, was restricted to England and Wales, with Northern Ireland and Scotland being specifically excluded. The concept of a unified authority with responsibility for all of the water-related functions within a river basin or series of river basins was not new. The Duke of Richmond introduced a river conservancy bill into Parliament in 1878, and the Council of the Society of Arts was prepared to award medals to those who could devise suitable watershed districts to aid such conservancy. Frederick Toplis received a silver medal for his plan to create 12 watershed districts, each run by commissioners, who would have powers to acquire all of the waterworks within their area, and to manage both them and the rivers for water supply and the prevention of flooding and pollution. He saw the need for each to be supported by competent legal advisers and engineers. His watershed districts were remarkably similar to the water authorities created under the 1973 Act, but quite different to those of the other five entrants whose plans were also published at the time. The only bodies which were responsible for a range of water management functions were the Thames Conservancy, created in 1857, and the Lee Conservancy Board, created in 1868.

The first moves towards more widespread management of river basins in England and Wales were enshrined in the Land Drainage Act 1930, which although primarily concerned with land drainage to prevent flooding, created catchment boards. These were responsible for the management of main rivers, and each was based around a river basin or group of river basins. Because of the emphasis on land drainage, they did not cover the whole of England and Wales, but this changed in 1948, when the River Boards Act 1948 created 32 river boards. They inherited the powers of the catchment boards where they existed, and took over responsibility for flood prevention from local authorities where they did not. The river boards had additional responsibilities concerning fisheries, the prevention of pollution and the gauging of rivers, to record flows and levels. They were in turn replaced by 27 river authorities following the passing of the Water Resources Act 1963, each with additional duties to monitor water quality and protect water resources.

In parallel with these developments, the Water Act 1945 had marked the start of a national water supply policy. It had recognised the need for central government to supervise the statutory suppliers of water, and to be involved in the difficult issues of water supply. It had also recognised that the supply of water to non-domestic consumers was part of an integrated policy, and had introduced the concept of abstraction licensing. In many areas, pollution of rivers by sewage was a serious problem, resulting from rapid expansion of population, and little incentive to invest in sewage treatment works. The Rivers (Prevention of Pollution) Act 1951 introduced discharge licensing, and with extra powers from a similar Act of 1961, tried to encourage local authorities to invest more in such works, but the Working Party on Sewage Disposal, which reported in 1970, concluded that there were over 3,000 sewage treatment works which were performing inadequately.

List of water authorities

Bibliography

References

United Kingdom Acts of Parliament 1973
Former nationalised industries of the United Kingdom
Water in the United Kingdom